Bionic Commando, originally released as  in Japan, is a platform game released by Capcom for the Family Computer and Nintendo Entertainment System in 1988. It is based on the 1987 arcade game Bionic Commando.

As Ladd, a member of the FF Battalion, the player explores each stage and obtain the necessary equipment to progress. Ladd is equipped with a mechanical arm featuring a grappling gun, allowing him to pull himself forward or swing from the ceiling. As such, the series is one of few instances of a platform game in which the player cannot jump. To cross gaps or climb ledges, Ladd must use his bionic arm.

In the game's instruction manual, the character is only known as "Player". In the game's ending, his name is revealed as "Ladd". The Game Boy version, a retelling of this game, calls the character "Rad". In the Game Boy Color remake, the main character is unnamed. His full name of Nathan "Rad" Spencer was revealed in 2009's Bionic Commando for the Xbox 360 and Playstation 3.

Gameplay

Bionic Commando is a platform game in which the player controls Ladd, whose mission is to rescue Super Joe and to stop the Albatros project. The game begins on an overworld map, where, Starting at Area 0, players can move Ladd's helicopter to any connected Area on the map in a nonlinear fashion. Each time Ladd's helicopter moves, the enemy ground vehicles will also move. Once the helicopter reaches its destination without crossing over the path of an enemy vehicle, the player can choose to "descend" and play that area or to "transfer" to a different Area. If the helicopter is intercepted by an enemy vehicle, then Ladd must engage the enemy in an overhead shooter level similar to Capcom's Commando. Ladd, armed with a weapon and his grappling hook that he can swing around in a circle to deflect bullets and enemies, must defeat the enemy soldiers and reach the end of the stage. These are the only stages where the player can earn a continue.

When Ladd descends into an Area, the player must choose which equipment to take along, and is then dropped into a sidescrolling platforming level. There, the player must first find one or multiple Communications Rooms - where the player can communicate with allies or wiretap enemy conversations - and then proceed each Area's Computer Room, where a boss will be guarding the computer core the player must destroy to clear the Area. Ladd cannot jump, so the player must use Ladd's weapons and his bionic arm to defeat enemies and navigate platforms and obstacles. Players can extend his bionic arm overhead, directly in front, and above at a 45-degree angle, and can grapple to higher platforms, swing across chasms, and pick up items. Additional equipment such as weapons, protective gear, and communications devices can be found by clearing Areas or finding them in levels, some of which are vital to progressing further in the game. In addition to the regular "combat areas", there are also safe "neutral areas"; non-hostile zones where Ladd can gain additional information from allied and enemy soldiers and find items. If Ladd fires his weapon in any neutral area, an alarm sounds, and all soldiers will become hostile to Ladd.

Plot

Bionic Commando takes place sometime in the 1980s and centers on two warring states: the Federation and the Empire. Federation Forces discover top secret documents about "Albatros", an unfinished project developed by the Empire's predecessor, the "Badds" (also known as the "Nazz" or Nazis in the Japanese version). Imperial leader Generalissimo Killt decides to complete the project himself. Upon learning the Empire's plot, the Federation sends in its national hero, Super Joe (the main character from the 1985 Capcom game Commando) to infiltrate the Empire, but he is captured. The Federation then sends in a second operative named Ladd to rescue him and to uncover the secret behind the Albatros project. Ladd is a member of the FF (Double Force) Battalion, a team of commandos specially trained to use wired guns to infiltrate enemy bases.

Gameplay begins as Ladd starts in Area 1, in which he is told that the first several areas, already infiltrated by Federation troops, have communication devices and rooms that can be used to stay in contact with the Federation and for wiretapping to gain intelligence from the Empire. Upon reaching Area 3, Ladd finds through enemy intelligence that Super Joe has been transported to the Imperial "disposal area", which a Federation spy later confirms. However, upon reaching the disposal area, an Imperial commander tells Ladd that Super Joe has been transported elsewhere. Eventually, Ladd rescues Super Joe, who informs Ladd that the Albatros project is a powerful laser cannon the Badds were unable to complete. However, the one person vital to the project's completion, Master-D (Hitler), is dead, and Generalissimo Killt has been unsuccessfully trying to resurrect him. Super Joe tells Ladd that they must stop Killt before he succeeds, and he asks Ladd to accompany him to the Imperial base located in Area 12.

When Ladd reaches the Imperial base, Super Joe tells him to break the power system in order to release two power barriers that are guarding the incomplete project. After doing so, Super Joe tells Ladd to defeat Killt and escape while he goes to destroy the base's power source. When Ladd reaches Killt's chamber, Killt boasts that the Albatros project has been completed without Master-D's help, turning off the device that would have resurrected him. As Killt is about to kill Ladd , electric shocks begin to occur around the holding tank containing Master-D's body, reviving Master-D and instantly killing Killt. Master-D then exits the tank and approaches Ladd, saying that he will use the Federation's forces to take over the world. Ladd vows to fight against Master-D, who calls Ladd a "damn fool" and unveils the Albatros. After destroying the Albatros, Ladd encounters a dying comrade named Hal, who gives Ladd a bazooka and tells him that Master-D is escaping and that he needs to shoot the bazooka into the cockpit of Master-D's escape chopper. Ladd uses his bionic arm to swing himself towards Master-D's escape chopper and fires the bazooka into the cockpit; upon doing so, Ladd screams: "Your number's up! Monster!" Then, in a series of slow-motion frames, the game shows Master-D's head explode.

The 60-second alarm inside the Imperial base sounds off. Ladd escapes, realizes that Super Joe is still inside, and runs back in to rescue him. The Federation's commander orders the full evacuation of the base. At the Federation base, troops surround Ladd and Super Joe to celebrate their victory. On August 2, 2010, an old Super Joe recalls the entire story and hopes that it will live on.

Development

Localization

For the release of the international version of the game, several changes were made. All references to Nazism in text and imagery were removed for the English localization. The Empire in the Japanese version was actually a neo-Nazi nation and the Imperial Army's insignia was a Nazi Swastika with a thunderbolt behind it. In the English version, the Nazis are referred as the "Badds", though the backstory in its manual refers to them as the "Nazz". The Imperial Army's Swastika insignia was changed into a new one resembling an eagle; and the leader of the villains, originally called Weizmann in the Japanese version, was renamed Killt, although the soldiers and characters keep their same Nazi-like appearance. The difficulty of the game was rebalanced and some of the areas were made less difficult.

One of the most prominent differences is the identity of the ultimate antagonist of the game, who is meant to be a revived Adolf Hitler in the Japanese version. For the English version, the character was renamed "Master-D", however his appearance remained the same. There is a gory ending sequence in which Hitler's face explodes, which was also kept intact in the English version.

Music
The music for the game was created by video game music composer Junko Tamiya, who was credited under the pseudonym "Gondamin". Two songs from the Arcade versions are used in some areas. The music for the original arcade game was developed by Harumi Fujita. Tamiya adapted two of the original arcade tracks (The "Bionic Commando Theme" and "The Powerplant") and expanded the soundtrack by adding several more new songs in the console versions for the Japanese Famicom and the NES versions.

Reception

According to Capcom employee Ben Judd, the game did not sell well in Japan.

In 1988, Nintendo Power featured it on the cover of its second issue with an 11-page "monster review" plus foldout poster. In 1997 Electronic Gaming Monthly ranked it the 32nd best console video game of all time, assessing that the fact that the player could not jump and had to instead swing around with his bionic arm added an unexpected level of depth to the platform genre. In 2003, the NES version of Bionic Commando was inducted into GameSpot's list of the greatest games of all time. In 2008, Nintendo Power ranked it as the 17th best Nintendo Entertainment System video game, describing it as one of the console's most original action games due to the ability to swing. GamesRadar ranked it the fourth best NES game ever made. The staff called it a classic and praised its grappling mechanic. The Japanese magazine Famitsu gave it 26 out of 40.

Legacy

Remakes and re-releases
A portable adaptation of Bionic Commando was released for the Game Boy in 1992. The Game Boy version is based on the NES game, featuring the same gameplay and stages, and a similar plot, but changes the present day setting into a futuristic one. A second remake, Bionic Commando Rearmed, was developed by GRIN and released in 2008 as a downloadable game for the PlayStation 3, Xbox 360, and Windows.

The NES version was re-released as one of three NES games in the Game Boy Advance compilation Capcom Classics Mini-Mix, along with Strider and Mighty Final Fight.

Novelization
The game was novelized as Bionic Commando by J. B. Stamper as part of the Worlds of Power series of novels based on the NES version. The main character is identified as Jack Markson, who loses an arm when ninjas attack his hotel room and kidnap Super Joe. The Federation replaces his missing limb with a bionic arm that has a grappling hook and a number of other gadgets that are not featured in the game, like a flame thrower and a device that forces prisoners to tell the truth. Like most books in the series, violence was toned down to non-lethality in most cases (he usually shoots enemy soldiers with tranquilizers), although certain events, like the deaths of Hal and Killt, are kept. Much of the game's middle is skimmed over in order to fit it all into the book.

References

External links

 Illustrated Bionic Commando story
 
 

1988 video games
Bionic Commando
Capcom games
Game Boy games
Video games about Nazi Germany
Nintendo Entertainment System games
Platform games
Side-scrolling video games
Video games about cyborgs
Video games developed in Japan
Video games set in the 1980s
Video games with alternative versions
Metroidvania games

de:Bionic Commando
fr:Bionic Commando
gl:Bionic Commando
ja:トップシークレット (ゲーム)